Bocula pallens is a moth of the family Erebidae first described by Frederic Moore in 1882. It is found in northern India, and Sri Lanka.

Description
Its wingspan is about 22 mm. The male has fasciculate (bundled) antennae. Anal tuft very large. Underside of forewings with a patch of differently formed scales on median nervure. Hindwings shortened, with a large patch of flocculent (woolly) scaled below costa, the costal neuration being distorted downwards. Male with a patch of curved woolly hair on apical part of margin of hindwing. Male ochreous brown. Forewings with traces of antemedial, medial, and postmedial speckled lines. A purplish rufous marginal band narrowing to apex and outer angle and with a slight indentation near apex. A marginal series of pale specks present. Hindwings whitish. Female has inner edge of the marginal band of hindwings more curved inwards at centre.

References

Rivulinae
Moths of Asia